Stadthalle Villach is an indoor sporting arena located in Villach, Austria.  The arena has a capacity of 4,500 people and was built in 1969.  It is currently home to the EC VSV ice hockey team of the Austrian Hockey League.

References

Indoor ice hockey venues in Austria
Villach
Sports venues in Carinthia (state)